The California Reporter of Decisions is a reporter of decisions supervised by the Supreme Court of California responsible for editing and publishing the published opinions of the judiciary of California. The Supreme Court's decisions are published in official reporters known as California Reports and the decisions of the Courts of Appeal are published in the California Appellate Reports.

List of Reporters

References 
 

California state courts
State constitutional officers of California